The 1930 Ice Hockey World Championships were held between January 30 and February 10, 1930, in Chamonix, France, Vienna, Austria, and Berlin, Germany. This event was the first world championships independent of hockey at the Olympics.

Canada, represented by the Toronto CCMs, beat the German team in the gold medal match by a score of 6 to 1 to win the title.

Germany won their first European Championship, defeating Switzerland in Berlin two to one.  The lone game in Vienna was played to determine the European Bronze, Austria shutout Poland two to zero to round out the medals.

Final tournament

Final 

The tournament was a direct knock-out playoff. The Canadian team was considered so dominant that it did not participate in the knock-out tournament. Canada was put into the gold medal final game, and the tournament was played to determine an opponent.

Warm winter weather melted the ice in Chamonix, France and forced the Ligue Internationale de Hockey sur Glace officials to move the tournament to Berlin, Germany, and the Sportpalast (which had artificial ice). Additionally, the fourth place match was played in Vienna, Austria, making this the only world hockey championship tournament to take place in three different countries.

The Canadian team lost to Austria 1-0 on February 7 (in Vienna) in an exhibition match. The loss to Austria was the first time any Canadian team had lost to a European team.

Ranking and statistics

Final standings
The final standings of the tournament:

Canadian winning team
 Gordon Grant, Alex Park, Joe Griffin, Willie Adams, Howard Armstrong,Bert Clayton, Fred Radke, Don Hutchinson, Percy Timpson (GK), Les Allen coach

European Championship medal table

References

External links
 Complete tournament results at Passionhockey.com
 Compiled standings
 Translated historical overview from Finnish source

Men's World Championships
IIHF Men's World Ice Hockey Championships
International ice hockey competitions hosted by France
International ice hockey competitions hosted by Germany
International ice hockey competitions hosted by Austria
Ice Hockey World Championships
Ice Hockey World Championships
World Championships
World Championships
1930s in Vienna
1930s in Berlin
Sports competitions in Vienna
Sports competitions in Berlin
Sport in Chamonix